Philipp Siegl (born 16 December 1993) is an Austrian professional footballer who plays as a defensive midfielder for SV Lafnitz.

Club career
He made his Austrian Football First League debut for TSV Hartberg on 11 August 2017 in a game against FC Liefering.

References

External links
 

1993 births
Living people
Austrian footballers
SV Stegersbach players
TSV Hartberg players
SV Lafnitz players
SV Horn players
Austrian Football Bundesliga players
2. Liga (Austria) players
Austrian Regionalliga players
Association football midfielders